Riverhawks may refer to:

Canada
Niagara Riverhawks junior hockey team
Edmonton Riverhawks, baseball team in the West Coast League

United States
Anne Arundel Community College Riverhawks (Arnold, Maryland)
Cincinnati Riverhawks soccer team (Cincinnati, Ohio)
Johnstown Riverhawks defunct indoor football team.
Northeastern State University Riverhawks (Tahlequah, Oklahoma)
Susquehanna University River Hawks (Selinsgrove, Pennsylvania)
Rockford RiverHawks professional baseball team (Springfield, Illinois)
UMass Lowell River Hawks (Lowell, Massachusetts)
Quad City Riverhawks Premier Basketball League team (Moline, Illinois)
Umpqua Community College Riverhawks (Roseburg, Oregon)

See also
Osprey, a species of bird